Tadeusz Motowidło (born 21 July 1952 in Trójczyce) is a Polish politician. He was elected to Sejm on 25 September 2005, getting 13,488 votes in 30 Rybnik district as a candidate from Democratic Left Alliance list.

He was also a member of Sejm 2001-2005.

See also
Members of Polish Sejm 2005-2007

References

1952 births
Living people
Democratic Left Alliance politicians
Members of the Polish Sejm 2001–2005
Members of the Polish Sejm 2005–2007
Members of the Polish Sejm 2007–2011